Ciara Judge is an Irish scientist from Kinsale, County Cork and a public speaker. She was a finalist of the 42nd BT Young Scientist and Technology Exhibition in 2013 at the age of fifteen with two others: Emer Hickey, Sophie Healy-Thow. She also won a First place Award in the European Union Contest for Young Scientists 2013. In 2014, she jointly with her 2 friends won the grand prize in Google Science Fair Ciara was also listed as one of the 25 most influential teens in Time for the year 2014 as a result of her innovation.

The innovation
At the time of her win, Judge was a second-year student at Kinsale Community School in Kinsale. Their project involved a statistical investigation of the effects of Diazotroph bacteria on plant germination. They investigated how the bacteria could be used to fight world hunger. Their project aims to provide a solution to low crop yields by pairing a nitrogen-fixing bacteria in the soil with cereal crops. They found their test crops germinated in half the time and had a drymass yield up to 7 percent greater than usual.

Activities
Ciara is a former member of the Irish Digital Youth Council. She sometimes writes as a guest columnist in Ireland's technology website (siliconrepublic.com). She was honoured for her interest in STEM (Science Technology, Engineering and Mathematics) and awarded as top role model. She was the speaker in Excited Digital Learning Conference at Dublin Castle, Ireland (June 2014). In September 2014 Ciara was also a keynote speaker at the Irish Digital Forum in Dublin

References

External links 
 
Combating the global food crisis: Diazotroph Bacteria as a Cereal Crop Growth Promoter at YouTube

Irish women scientists
People from Kinsale
Food scientists
Young Scientist and Technology Exhibition
Living people
1997 births
Irish scientists